Vuosalmi (now Druzhnoye) is a former village of Finland on the Karelian Isthmus, now in Russia. It is located on the northern shore of the Vuoksi River and served as the location of the Battle of Vuosalmi in 1944.

References

Further reading
  Sarkanen Jaakko & Repo Kaino: Muolaa ja Äyräpää vv. 1870–1944, pp. 508–510. Helsinki: Muolaalaisten Seura ry, 1952 

Karelian Isthmus